Protein phosphatase 1 regulatory subunit 12C is a protein that in humans is encoded by the PPP1R12C gene.

Function

The gene encodes a subunit of myosin phosphatase. The encoded protein regulates the catalytic activity of protein phosphatase 1 delta and assembly of the actin cytoskeleton. Alternatively spliced transcript variants encoding multiple isoforms have been observed for this gene.

References

Further reading